The 2003 League of Ireland Premier Division was the 19th season of the League of Ireland Premier Division. The division was made up of 10 teams. Shelbourne were champions.

Regular season
The 2003 season would see the League of Ireland Premier Division change from a winter league to a summer league. Each team played four rounds of games, totalling 36 games each.

Final table

Results

Matches 1–18

Matches 19–36

Top scorers

Promotion/relegation play-off
Four teams entered the promotion/relegation play-off. The second, third and fourth placed teams from the 2003 League of Ireland First Division were joined by the ninth placed team from the Premier Division.

Semi-final
1st Legs

2nd Legs

Derry City win 4–0 on aggregate

Finn Harps win 3–1 on aggregate

Final

Derry City win 2–1 on aggregate and retain their place in the Premier Division.

See also
 2003 Shelbourne F.C. season
 2003 League of Ireland First Division

References

 
Ireland
Ireland
1
League of Ireland Premier Division seasons
1